A referendum on foodstuffs was held in Switzerland on 10 June 1906. Voters were asked whether they approved of a new federal law concerning foodstuffs and basic commodities. The proposal was approved by 62.6% of voters.

Background
The referendum was an optional referendum, which only a majority of the vote, as opposed to the mandatory referendums, which required a double majority; a majority of the popular vote and majority of the cantons.

Results

References

1906 referendums
1906 in Switzerland
Referendums in Switzerland